James Douglas (died 2 June 1751) was a British politician.

Douglas succeeded Henry Vane, 1st Earl of Darlington as the Member of Parliament for St. Mawes from 1741 to 1747 and for Malmesbury from 1747 until his death in 1751. He was a younger son of James Douglas, a merchant in London, of the family of Douglas of Friarshaw, and his wife (née Russell). He married Albinia, daughter of Major-General William Farrington and widow of Robert Bertie, 1st Duke of Ancaster; she died on 29 July 1745.

References

1751 deaths
Members of the Parliament of Great Britain for English constituencies
British MPs 1741–1747
British MPs 1747–1754
Members of the Parliament of Great Britain for constituencies in Cornwall
Place of birth missing
Year of birth missing